An affogato, more traditionally known as "affogato al caffe" (Italian for "drowned in coffee"), is an Italian coffee-based dessert. It usually takes the form of a scoop of plain milk-flavored (fior di latte) or vanilla gelato or ice cream topped or "drowned" with a shot of hot espresso. Some variations also include a shot of amaretto, Bicerin, Kahlua, or other liqueur.

Varieties of affogato 
Though restaurants and cafes in Italy categorize the affogato as a dessert, some restaurants and cafes outside of Italy categorize it as a beverage. Whether a dessert or beverage, restaurants and cafes usually serve the affogato in a tall narrowing glass, allowing the fior di latte, vanilla gelato, or ice cream to melt and combine with espresso into the hollowed space in the bottom of the glass. Occasionally, coconut, berries, honeycomb and multiple flavors of ice cream are added. A biscotto or cookie can also be served and enjoyed alongside this beverage. Affogati are often enjoyed as a post-meal coffee dessert combo eaten and or drunk with a spoon or straw. 

While the recipe of the affogato is more or less standard in Italy, consisting of a scoop of fior di latte (unflavored) or vanilla gelato topped with a shot of espresso, variations exist in European and American restaurants.

History 
The origins of the affogato in Italian history are unknown, but it gained popularity in Italy during the 1950s. This coincided with the industrialization of ice cream production. In America, the word affogato was included in English dictionaries as of 1992.

See also 
 Macchiato (disambiguation)

References 

Ice cream drinks
Coffee drinks
Italian cuisine
Italian drinks
Coffee in Italy